Etta is an unincorporated community in Union County, Mississippi, United States. Its ZIP code is 38627. It has a population of 1,120 as of the 2010 Census.

Notes

Unincorporated communities in Union County, Mississippi
Unincorporated communities in Mississippi